The 1996–97 NBA season was the Kings' 48th season in the National Basketball Association, and 12th season in Sacramento. During the off-season, the Kings acquired Mahmoud Abdul-Rauf from the Denver Nuggets, and signed free agent Jeff Grayer in January. Coming off their first playoff appearance in ten years, expectations in Sacramento were high. However, the Kings struggled with an 8–17 start to the season, as Brian Grant only played just 24 games due to a shoulder injury, and Billy Owens missed 16 games early into the season with a groin injury. The Kings would rebound to get back into playoff contention, holding a 21–28 record at the All-Star break. However, after holding a 28–32 record as of March 5, the team went on a 7-game losing streak as head coach Garry St. Jean was fired, and replaced with assistant Eddie Jordan for the remainder of the season. The Kings finished sixth in the Pacific Division with a 34–48 record, missing the playoffs by finishing just two games behind the 8th-seeded Los Angeles Clippers.

Mitch Richmond averaged 25.9 points and 1.5 steals per game, and was named to the All-NBA Second Team, and selected for the 1997 NBA All-Star Game, while Abdul-Rauf finished second on the team in scoring with 13.7 points per game, and Olden Polynice provided the team with 12.5 points and 9.4 rebounds per game. In addition, second-year forward Corliss Williamson showed improvement averaging 11.6 points per game, while Owens provided with 11.0 points and 5.9 rebounds per game, Grant contributed 10.5 points and 5.9 rebounds per game, Michael Smith averaged 6.6 points and 9.5 rebounds per game, and second-year guard Tyus Edney contributed 6.9 points and 3.2 assists per game off the bench.

Following the season, Grant signed as a free agent with the Portland Trail Blazers, while Edney signed with the Boston Celtics, Duane Causwell was traded to the Miami Heat, Grayer and Kevin Gamble were both released to free agency, and Lionel Simmons retired after only playing seven seasons in the NBA with the Kings, due to knee surgery.

Draft picks

Roster

Regular season

Season standings

z - clinched division title
y - clinched division title
x - clinched playoff spot

Record vs. opponents

Game log

Player statistics

NOTE: Please write the players statistics in alphabetical order by last name.

Awards and records
 Mitch Richmond, All-NBA Second Team

Transactions

References

See also
 1996-97 NBA season

Sacramento Kings seasons
Sacramento
Sacramento
Sacramento